The Leeds Corn Exchange is a Victorian building and former corn exchange in Leeds, West Yorkshire, England, which was completed in 1863. It is a grade I listed building.

History

The Corn exchange was designed by Cuthbert Brodrick, a Hull architect best known for Leeds Town Hall, and built between 1861 and 1863. The dome design was based on that of the Bourse de commerce of Paris by François-Joseph Bélanger and François Brunet, completed in 1811. In the late 1980s Speciality Shops plc restored it and converted it into a retail facility.

After a further restoration in 2007, the Corn Exchange re-opened in November 2008 as a boutique shopping centre for independent retailers. The  ground level was occupied by Piazza by Anthony until its sudden closure in June 2013.

In 2017 the Corn Exchange was acquired by property company Rushbond.

 the Corn Exchange contains about 30 independent retailers and food outlets. It is described as "one of only three remaining Corn Exchanges still functioning as a centre for trade in Britain", albeit no longer functioning as a corn exchange.

The building was depicted in an official BBC trailer for the 2021 Rugby League World Cup (in reference to Leeds being one of the host cities).

See also
Architecture of Leeds
Grade I listed buildings in West Yorkshire
Listed buildings in Leeds (City and Hunslet Ward - northern area)

References

Further reading

External links

Leeds Corn Exchange website
Pictures of the Corn Exchange by Steve Cadman

Grade I listed buildings in Leeds
Grade I listed markets and exchanges
Commercial buildings completed in 1864
Shopping centres in Leeds
Cuthbert Brodrick buildings
1864 establishments in England